Lac-Saint-Paul is a municipality in the Laurentides region of Quebec, Canada, part of the Antoine-Labelle Regional County Municipality.

History
The first settler was Joseph Dufour, followed by more families in 1898. In 1915, its post office opened under the name Lac Gorman, after the lake the settlement was located on. In 1919, the local parish was founded, named in honour of its patron, Saint Paul. That same year, the lake and post office were renamed to Lac Saint-Paul.

In 1922, the Municipality of Lac-Saint-Paul was created out of territory ceded from the United Township Municipality of Wurtele, Moreau et Gravel.

Demographics

Private dwellings occupied by usual residents: 275 (total dwellings: 423)

Mother tongue:
 English as first language: 5%
 French as first language: 93%
 English and French as first language: 2%
 Other as first language: 0%

Local government

List of former mayors:
 Jean Coulombe (...–2005)
 Claude Ménard (2005–2013)
 Fabricius Louis Lauzon (2013–2016)
 Normand Marier (2016–2017)
 Colette Quevillon (2017–present)

See also
List of municipalities in Quebec

References

External links

Incorporated places in Laurentides
Municipalities in Quebec